Ten Deadliest Snakes with Nigel Marven is a twelve-part wildlife documentary series from 2013 to 2017. It began airing on Eden Channel in 2013. Seasons 1 and 2 were also broadcast on Animal Planet Europe, while season 3 was premiered on Nat Geo Wild UK and later screened on Nat Geo Wild Europe & Africa in 2017. It is presented by Nigel Marven, who travels around the world and in each hour-long episode he counts down his list of ten deadliest snakes in each different country or continent. The series is produced by Image Impact.

Episodes
Between 2013 and 2017, 3 seasons were produced, each containing 4 episodes, making up 12 episodes in total.

Costa Rica
Animals featured:
10. yellow-bellied sea snake
9. jumping pit viper
8. side-striped palm pit viper
7. hognose pit viper
6. eyelash pit viper
5. Central American coral snake
4. Neotropical rattlesnake
3. Picado's pit viper
2. terciopelo
1. black-headed bushmaster

The programme also includes the Collared aracari, Black-cheeked woodpecker, White-necked jacobin, 
Crowned woodnymph, Green-breasted mango, Snowcap, Northern caiman lizard, Plumed basilisk, Tent-making bat, bird snake, Granular poison frog, Smooth helmeted iguana, Leafcutter ant, milk snake, American crocodile

United States
Animals featured:
10. rock rattlesnake
9. sidewinder
8. copperhead
7. timber rattlesnake
6. tiger rattlesnake
5. cottonmouth
4. Eastern coral snake
3. Eastern diamondback rattlesnake
2. Western diamondback rattlesnake
1. Mojave rattlesnake

The programme also includes the Sonoran mountain kingsnake, Pantherophis obsoletus, Ring-necked snake, Northern short-tailed shrew, Northern slimy salamander, Texas horned lizard, Florida banded water snake, Scarlet kingsnake, Gopher tortoise, Arizona black rattlesnake, Gila monster, Western hognose snake, Arizona blond tarantula.

South Africa
Animals featured:
10. Cape coral snake
9. boomslang
8. rinkhals
7. Eastern green mamba
6. Gaboon viper
5. forest cobra
4. Mozambique spitting cobra
3. puff adder
2. Cape cobra
1. black mamba

The programme also includes the Angonoka tortoise, Cape sugarbird, Mole snake, Southern right whale, Raucous toad, Cape weaver, Meerkat, Sociable weaver, Cape Vulture.

China
Animals featured:
10. short-tailed mamushi
9. white-lipped pit viper
8. black-banded sea krait
7. Taiwanese habu
6. Russell's viper
5. Chinese cobra and monocled cobra
4. many-banded krait
3. sharp-nosed viper
2. Mangshan pit viper
1. king cobra

The programme also includes the king ratsnake, Elaphe taeniura, Mandarin rat snake, tiger keelback, Ptyas Dhumnades, Formosan rock macaque, Swinhoe's Pheasant, ophisaurus hainanensis, and coconut crab.

Malaysia
Animals featured:
10. temple pit viper
9. reticulated python
8. red-headed krait
7. Siamese peninsula pit viper
6. mountain pit viper
5. beaked sea snake
4. Malayan pit viper
3. mangrove pit viper
2. King cobra 
1. Sumatran spitting cobra and monocled cobra

The programme also includes the Elephant trunk snake, Great hornbill, Heteropoda davidbowie, Asian water monitor

Australia
Animals featured:
10. Red-bellied black snake
9. Inland taipan
8. Common death adder
7. Broad-headed snake
6. Australian copperhead
5. Tiger snake
4. Rough-scaled snake
3. Mulga snake
2. Coastal taipan
1. Eastern brown snake

Other Animals Tasmanian Devil, Saltwater crocodile, freshwater snake, Lesueur's velvet gecko, Southern cassowary, Frilled lizard

India
Animals featured:
10. Laticauda colubrina
9. Trimeresurus andersonii
8. Trimeresurus gramineus
7. Trimeresurus malabaricus
6. Hypnale hypnale
5. Ophiophagus hannah
4. Naja naja
3. Echis carinatus
2. Bungarus caeruleus
1. Daboia russeli

The programme also includes the Amblypygi, Python molurus, Cyrtodactylus deccanensis, Rat snake, short-crested bay island forest lizard, Andaman bronzeback snake

Europe
Animals featured:
10. Telescopus fallax
9. Malpolon monspessulanus
8. Vipera ursinii
7. Vipera seoanei
6. Vipera latastei
5. Vipera berus
4. Vipera aspis
3. Macrovipera schweizeri
2. Vipera ammodytes
1. Montivipera xanthina

The programme also includes the Timon lepidus, Elaphe quatuorlineata, Blanus cinereus, Alytes, Ciconia ciconia, Sheltopusik, Green whip snake, Zamenis longissimus, Common midwife toad

Philippines
Animals featured:
10. Mangrove Snake
9. Reticulated Python
8. Palawan Pit Viper
7. Sea krait
6. Mindanao Pit Viper
5. King Cobra
4. Philippine Coral Snake
3. Philippine Pit Viper
2. Samar cobra
1. Philippine cobra

Brazil
Animals featured:
10. Painted Coral Snake
9. Golden Lancehead
8. Urutu
7. Pampas Lancehead
6. South American coral snake
5. Amazonian Palm Viper
4. Camboia
3. Cascabel
2. Jararacussu
1. Jararaca

Mexico
Animals featured:
10. Tamaulipan Rock Rattlesnake
9. Mexican Dusky Rattlesnake
8. Texas Coral Snake
7. Santa Catalina Rattlesnake
6. Mitchell's Rattlesnake
5. Baja California Rattlesnake
4. Red Diamondback Rattlesnake
3. Taylor's Cantil
2. Western Diamondback Rattlesnake
1. Terciopelo

Arabia
Animals featured:
10. Arabian cat snake
9. Arabian False Cobra
8. Persian Horned Viper
7. Puff adder
6. Arabian Cobra
5. Desert Blacksnake
4. Persian Gulf Sea Snake
3. Arabian Horned Viper
2. Sind Saw-scaled Viper
1. Oman Carpet Viper

References

External links 
 Ten Deadliest Snakes with Nigel Marven on IMDb.com
 Ten Deadliest Snakes with Nigel Marven on Eden Channel website
 Ten Deadliest Snakes with Nigel Marven on Nat Geo TV website

Nature educational television series
Animal Planet original programming